Amanda Morris is an American chemist who is the Patricia Caldwell Faculty Fellow and Professor of Inorganic and Energy Chemistry at Virginia Tech. Her research considers next-generation materials for catalysis and light-harvesting. She was elected Chair of the American Chemical Society Gay and Transgender Chemists and Allies committee in 2021.

Early life and education 
Morris was an undergraduate at Pennsylvania State University. She moved to Johns Hopkins University for doctoral research, where she worked alongside Gerald Meyer. In 2009, Morris joined Princeton University and the laboratory of Andrew B. Bocarsly.

Research and career 
Morris makes use of photo-electrochemistry to understand new materials for renewable energy. She has created photosynthetic systems for solar harvesting. Morris has proposed metal–organic frameworks as light harvesters and high surface-area catalysts. Metal organic frameworks are stable solid state organic-inorganic hybrid materials. The high surface areas mean that they can improve their catalytic activity. Her early research looked to understand how to control the optical and electronic properties of metal organic frameworks. She studied how electrons were transported through metal organic frameworks, and how to design MOFs that showed efficient photo-induced charge transport.

Morris served as co-chair of the Virginia Tech LGBT Staff Caucus, where she led efforts to expand the university's non-discrimination clause to protect people from gender minorities. She also led efforts to install gender inclusive restrooms and use preferred names on university records. Morris was the first academic advisor of OSTEM. She was elected Chair of the American Chemical Society Gay and Transgender Chemists and Allies (GTCA) committee in 2021. She was made Head of the Department of Chemistry in 2022. Beyond her own research, she uses her laboratory to enhance the curriculum of the Roanoke City Public Schools.

Awards and honors 
 Jimmy W. Viers Teaching Award
 Patricia Caldwell Faculty Fellow
 Kavli Frontiers of Science Fellow
 Inter-American Photochemical Society Young Investigator Award
 John C. Schug Research Award
 Dreyfus Teacher-Scholar Award
 Alfred P. Sloan Research Fellow
 NSF CAREER Award Recipient
 Presidential Principles of Community Award
 College of Science Diversity Award
 Ralph E. Powe Junior Faculty Enhancement Award

Selected publications

References 

Living people
Year of birth missing (living people)
American women chemists
Johns Hopkins University alumni
Pennsylvania State University alumni
21st-century American chemists
Virginia Tech faculty
21st-century American women scientists